The 2013 Roma Maxima was the 75th edition of the Italian semi-classic cycle race previously known as Giro del Lazio. The Giro del Lazio has not been raced since 2008, and the 2013 edition was the first one with the new name.

The race was scheduled on 3 March 2013; it started on Via Appia Antica in Rome, passed through the cobblestone section of the ancient Appian Way and the steep climbs of the Roman hills, and ended again in Rome in Via dei Fori Imperiali, near the Coliseum, after .

The French Blel Kadri won the race after a  breakaway. A five-rider group, among whom there was also Vincenzo Nibali, tried to chase Kadri down, but Kadri managed to hold the gap all the way to Rome. 's Filippo Pozzato won the sprint for the second place, and Grega Bole was third. Since Roma Maxima is not a World Tour event, riders were not allowed to use the radio during the race; so both Pozzato and Bole did not know that Kadri was still away, and Pozzato celebrated on the finish line thinking he had won the race.

Teams
The start list included 16 teams – 9 ProTeams and 7 Professional Continental Teams – and a total of 128 riders.

Results

References

Roma Maxima
2013 in Italian sport
Roma Maxima
Roma Maxima